Stigmella salicis is a moth of the family Nepticulidae which is found in Europe. It was first described by the English entomologist, Henry Stainton in 1854. The type locality is from England.

Description
The wingspan is The thick erect hairs on the head vertex are ferruginous-orange. The collar is paler. Antennal eyecaps are whitish. The front wings are fuscous or dark fuscous, faintly purplish-tinged, somewhat sprinkled with pale yellowish ; an ochreous-whitish rather oblique fascia beyond middle; apical area beyond this sometimes more blackish ; outer half of cilia ochreous-white. Hindwings grey.

The moth is bivoltine (i.e. has two generations a year). In Great Britain adults are on wing from April to May and again from July to August. The flight period may be different in other parts of its range. The type locality is from England.

Life cycle

Egg
Eggs are laid on the underside of a rough-leaved willow leaf, usually concealed in the down close to a rib and can be found in May and August to September.

Larva
Larva, feed internally within a leaf and are amber-yellow with a pale brown head. They can be found in June and July and again from September to November.

They mine the leaves of their host plant, in a gallery which can be variable and highly contorted. The mine starts comparatively wide and is initially almost filled with frass. Later there are clear margins and the frass becomes broken. The mine can follow a leaf margin, a rib or can be highly contorted. It later widens to form a blotch, or if highly contorted with 'S' bends, a false blotch. The larvae feed on Myrica gale, Salix alba, Salix atrocinerea, Salix aurita, Salix babylonica, Salix caprea, Salix cinerea, Salix daphnoides, Salix fragilis, Salix lanata, Salix pentandra, Salix purpurea, Salix repens, Salix silesiaca, Salix triandra and Salix viminalis. Mines on the narrow-leaved willows can be difficult to distinguish from those of S. obliquella.

Pupa
The pupa is in a yellowish-brown cocoon spun in detritus and can be found in July and August, and from November through to April.

Distribution
S. salicis is found in Europe (except Iceland and Greece).

Note

References

External links
 
 Swedish moths
 UKmoths

Nepticulidae
Leaf miners
Moths described in 1854
Moths of Asia
Moths of Europe
Taxa named by Henry Tibbats Stainton